Jan Brzák-Felix (6 April 1912 – 15 July 1988) was a Czechoslovak slalom and sprint canoeist from Prague who competed from the mid-1930s to the early 1950s. Competing in three Summer Olympics, he won three medals in the C-2 1000 m event with two golds (1936, 1948) and one silver (1952).

Brzák-Felix also won four medals at the ICF Canoe Sprint World Championships with three golds (C-2 1000 m: 1950, C-2 10000 m: 1938, 1950) and one silver (C-2 1000 m: 1938).

He also competed at the Geneva 1949 ICF Canoe Slalom World Championships and earned two silver medals (C-1 team, C-2 team) and two bronze medals (C-1, C-2).

In 1955, Brzák-Felix teamed up with 1936 C-1 1000 m silver medalist Bohuslav Karlík to paddle the 118 miles (189.9 km) of the Vltava from České Budějovice to Prague in 20 hours.

References

Wallechinsky, David and Jaime Loucky (2008). "Canoeing: Men's Canadian Doubles 1000 Meters". In The Complete Book of the Olympics: 2008 Edition. London: Aurum Press Limited. pp. 482–3.

External links 
 
 

1912 births
1988 deaths
Canoeists at the 1936 Summer Olympics
Canoeists at the 1948 Summer Olympics
Canoeists at the 1952 Summer Olympics
Czechoslovak male canoeists
Olympic canoeists of Czechoslovakia
Olympic gold medalists for Czechoslovakia
Olympic silver medalists for Czechoslovakia
Olympic medalists in canoeing
ICF Canoe Sprint World Championships medalists in Canadian
Medalists at the 1952 Summer Olympics
Medalists at the 1948 Summer Olympics
Medalists at the 1936 Summer Olympics
Medalists at the ICF Canoe Slalom World Championships
Canoeists from Prague